El Pantera (English: The Panther) is a Mexican television series that aired on Canal 5 from May 14, 2007 to November 26, 2009. It is based on a comic book of the same name.  It narrates the life of Gervasio, a young man who fights crime in Mexico City. The title role is performed by Luis Roberto Guzmán.

The character of El Pantera was created in the 1970s by the writer Daniel Muñoz and artist Juan Alba for Mundo Vid. A novel called El Pantera, or La Noche del Pantera was written by Muñoz in the 1990s, followed by El Misterio de la Amenaza Negra.

Plot 
Gervasio Robles Villa, son of a white man  and a Oaxacan Indian woman, is imprisoned for assassinating his fiancée, a crime that he did not commit. During the time he was in jail, he learned Wushu from a mysterious man called "El Indio" (a Native American convicted for tax evasion). The Main General of the police, Porfirio Ayala, convinced of Villa's innocence, decides to release him and return him the life he was taken from. Nevertheless, this act of kindness is conditional. Gervasio will be able to remain free under one condition: he must work secretly with the police and to catch criminals who inhabit the city. Now, El Pantera must find himself, recover his life and discover what his destiny is, to be known as “The Panther”. Once in the city he meets a beautiful woman named Lola. Despite the fact that Lola has a past that not every woman would be proud of El Pantera falls in love with her.

In the 2nd Season, El Pantera must confront a new truth, that his girlfriend Rosaura was not killed, but faked her death in order to ascend to the title of "Reina del Narco" loosely translated as "Queen of the Drugtrade", as daughter of "El Rubio Barrios" she was in charge of running the Gulf Drug Cartel. El Pantera then must fight against Police, the Mexican Army, the Pacific Cartel, Korean Mafias and the DEA to save the woman he still loves from torture, death, and even her own ambition.

Cast

Main 
 Luis Roberto Guzmán as Gervasio/El Pantera
 Ignacio López Tarso as General Porfirio Ayala
 Alicia Machado as Diana (season 1)
 Raul Padilla "Choforo" as El Gorda
 Vanessa Terkes as Lola
 Miguel Pizarro as El Curro (season 1)
 Jessica Mas as Ángeles (season 1)
 Opi Domínguez as Artemisa

Recurring 
 Gerardo Taracena as El Mandril 
 Javier Escobar as Tereso
 Vanessa Mateo as Lolet
 Cristina Bernal as Lolet
 Fernanda López as Fernanda
 María Rocio García as Lolet
 Oscar Bonfiglio as Godinez
 Andrés García as El Rubio Barrios
 Irán Castillo as Rosaura
 Luis Gatica as El Procurador
 Issabela Camil as Virginia
 Luis Couturier as El Secretario de Defensa Alconedo
 Rodolfo de Anda as Santos
 Isela Vega as Procuradora
 Salvador Zerboni as Gabriel
 Alexis Ayala as Comandante Orozco
 Ximena Herrera as La Reina
 Fidel Zerda as Ausencio
 Roxana Rojo de la Vega as Paulina
 Thaily Amezcua as Mayra
 Nancy Taira as Ana
 Lila Aviles as Raquel
 Alessy as Sofía
 Krizia as Camila
 Joss as Brenda

Episodes

Series overview

Season 1 (2007)

Season 2 (2008)

Season 3 (2009)

References

External links 
 
- El Pantera | Fansite
Comic book site
- 4k - A profile of El Pantera

2007 Mexican television series debuts
2009 Mexican television series endings
Canal 5 (Mexico) original programming
Television shows based on comics
Mexican crime television series
Mexican drama television series
Superhero television shows
Works about Mexican drug cartels
Television series about organized crime